The 2002 Penn State Nittany Lions football team represented the Pennsylvania State University in the 2002 NCAA Division I-A football season. The team's head coach was Joe Paterno. It played its home games at Beaver Stadium in University Park, Pennsylvania.

Preseason
The Nittany Lions returned 16 starters from the previous season, who won five of its final seven games. Six starters returned on defense, led by defensive tackle Jimmy Kennedy, who returned for his fifth year despite speculations he would enter the NFL Draft.

The offensive unit averted a possible quarterback controversy when last year's starter Matt Senneca announced that he would not be returning for his final year of eligibility. Redshirt sophomore Zack Mills would lead the offense, with expectations high after showing flashes of brilliance coming off the bench in 2001. Larry Johnson would also become the featured back, after spending three seasons playing in a tailback-by-committee that had inconsistent production. Johnson will have the luxury of running behind an offensive line that returned all five starters.

Penn State was ranked number 24 in both the AP and Coaches college football preseason polls.

Recruiting class

Pre-season awards
 Jimmy Kennedy
Playboy pre-season All-American
Second-team Athlon Sports pre-season All-American
Second-team Lindy's pre-season All-American
 Zack Mills
Lindy's pre-season Big Ten Most Valuable Player

Schedule
Penn State did not play Big Ten teams Minnesota and Purdue this year.

Roster

Game summaries

UCF

After a sloppy first half, Penn State scored 17 unanswered points in the second half and then withstood a late charge to hold off the Golden Knights for a 27–24 win. Zack Mills was 13 of 20 for 194 yards with two touchdowns and no interceptions. On defense, Anthony Adams recovered a fumbled snap to set up a field goal, and Derek Wake blocked a field goal attempt. Trailing 27–9 in the fourth quarter, UCF got within three points with 24 seconds remaining but failed to recover the onside kick, and Penn State ran out the clock.

Nebraska

In front of a crowd of 110,753, a new Beaver Stadium attendance record that stood intact for 15 years, (110,823 VS Michigan 2017) Penn State routed the Cornhuskers 40–7, as Larry Johnson and backup quarterback Michael Robinson each had two touchdown runs. Cornerback Rich Gardner had his first career interception and returned it 44 yards for a touchdown in the third quarter. It was Penn State's first victory over a top 10 team since 1999.

Louisiana Tech

Penn State beat the Bulldogs 49–17, despite Tech's quarterback Luke McCown throwing for more than 400 yards but also threw three interceptions and had a fumble lost. Larry Johnson ran for 147 yards on 17 carries and two touchdowns and also had a touchdown reception. Michael Robinson also had three rushing touchdowns.

Iowa

After trailing the Hawkeyes by 22 points in the fourth quarter, Zack Mills threw for three touchdowns in the final 7:13 to tie the game 35–35 and force overtime, but the Nittany Lions were unable to score in overtime and lost 42–35. For the game, Mills completed 23 of 44 passes for a school record 399 yards and four touchdowns. The team finished with only 54 yards rushing, and Michael Robinson, who had five touchdowns in twelve carries in the past two games, was held to minus-2 yards on four carries.

But the play that was most shown repeatedly on sports highlights shows throughout the rest of the season happened after the game. Following a couple questionable calls by the line judge in overtime, Joe Paterno sprinted down the field to catch up with referee Dick Honig as he approached the tunnel and grabbed Honig by the back of the shirt to voice his displeasure with the way the game ended. Paterno was angered that Penn State wide receiver Tony Johnson caught a pass with both feet in bounds according to the stadium's video replay board, but the play was ruled an incompletion.

Wisconsin

Penn State scored on four of its first five possessions as the Lions beat the Badgers 34–31. Penn State scored on touchdowns from Zack Mills, Larry Johnson, and Sean McHugh and got four Robbie Gould field goals. Defensive tackle Jimmy Kennedy and defensive end Michael Haynes each had three sacks, as the Lions sacked Wisconsin quarterback Brooks Bollinger seven times. Wisconsin scored to close it to three points with 1:17 remaining, but Bryan Scott covered up the onside kick to seal the game.

Michigan

The Wolverines beat Penn State 27–24 in overtime. A slow first half gave way to a shootout in the second half. The game was tied 7–7 at halftime, and the teams combined for only 240 yards. Penn State led 13–7 late in the third quarter and looked to seize control of the game after forcing a Michigan punt at their own 20, but a roughing the punter penalty kept the drive alive, and Michigan found the end zone eight plays later. Zack Mills finished the day 19 of 31 for 264 yards and two touchdowns.

Joe Paterno expressed his displeasure with the officials for the second time this season as he yelled at referee David Witvoet after regulation. There were a number of odd and questionable actions by the officials during the game, as pointed out by the TV commentators, including the roughing the punter penalty and the referee refusing to ask for measurements when it appeared Michigan had been stopped short of first down. Each time he glanced at the sideline and signaled first down. It was most noticeable in the third quarter when he signaled first down even as Michigan was lining up in short-yardage formation, thinking it was third-and-1.

But Paterno and the coaching staff were most livid about a blown call with 40 seconds remaining in regulation and the score tied at 21–21. Receiver Tony Johnson had just made a leaping catch of a Mills pass at the Michigan 22. The side judge ruled Johnson out of bounds despite replays showing he had both feet at least a yard inbounds. Numerous replays on TV showed the large divot in the field where Johnson's feet had landed. Instead of a field goal opportunity to win the game in regulation, the game was forced into overtime.

Northwestern

Larry Johnson set Penn State's single-game rushing record as the Nittany Lions shut out the Wildcats 49–0. Johnson rushed for 257 yards on 23 carries and scored twice before sitting out the final 28 minutes. In all, twelve Penn State players carried the ball for a total of 423 yards. The defense recorded its first shutout since the 1999 Alamo Bowl, holding the Wildcats to 9 yards rushing and 202 total yards.

Ohio State

The Buckeyes defense held Zack Mills to only 98 yards passing and intercepted three passes, including one by Chris Gamble returned for a touchdown, to beat the Nittany Lions 13–7. Penn State was held to only 179 yards of offense and eight first downs, fewest under Joe Paterno. Despite this, Penn State led 7–3 at halftime and very nearly won the game at the end.

Illinois

Larry Johnson set the school record for rushing yards in a game, beating his own record from two weeks prior, as the Nittany Lions beat the Fighting Illini 18–7. Johnson rushed for 279 yards on 31 carries, including an 84-yard touchdown run. The Penn State defense went 11-plus quarters without allowing a touchdown before Illinois scored with 5:22 remaining.

Virginia

The defense held the Cavaliers to only 30 yards rushing as Penn State won 35–14. Zack Mills was 19 of 30 for 227 yards and two touchdowns. The Lions had 289 yards on the ground, including 118 yards on 31 carries and a touchdown by Larry Johnson. Backup quarterback and holder Chris Ganter also scored on a 30-yard run off of a fake field goal.

Indiana

Larry Johnson broke two school records as Penn State beat the Hoosiers 58–25. For the third time in five weeks, Johnson set the school's single-game rushing record with 327 yards on 28 carries. Johnson also broke Penn State's single-season rushing record with a total of 1,736 yards with two games left to play.

Michigan State

Larry Johnson became the ninth player in NCAA history to rush for 2,000 yards in a season as Penn State blew out the Spartans 61–7. Johnson finished the day with 279 yards and four touchdowns, all in the first half. Bryant Johnson also scored on an 81-yard punt return and a 41-yard touchdown reception. Penn State had 400 yards of offense at halftime and finished with 536 total yards, including 422 yards rushing.

2003 Capital One Bowl – Auburn

Larry Johnson finished with only 72 yards on 20 carries. Zack Mills was also ineffective, going 8 of 24 for 67 yards and an interception. He was pulled for a couple drives in the third quarter, and backup quarterback Michael Robinson led to the Lions for a field goal to go up 9–7.

Rankings

Awards

Watchlists

 Michael Haynes
Ted Hendricks Award semifinalist and finalist
 Bryant Johnson
Fred Biletnikoff Award watchlist
 Larry Johnson
Doak Walker Award watchlist, semifinalist and finalist
Maxwell Award finalist
Walter Camp Player of the Year finalist
 Jimmy Kennedy
Bronko Nagurski Trophy watchlist
Rotary Lombardi Award watchlist and semifinalist
Outland Trophy watchlist
 Zack Mills
Davey O'Brien Award watchlist and semifinalist
 Bryan Scott
Jim Thorpe Award watchlist

Players

 Gino Capone
Second-team All-Big Ten (conference media selection)
First-team Verizon CoSIDA Academic All-District
 Rich Gardner
Big Ten Defensive Player of the Week (September 14)
 Robbie Gould
Big Ten Specialist of the Week (October 5)
 Andrew Guman
Second-team Verizon CoSIDA Academic All-District
 Michael Haynes
Second-team Associated Press All-American
CNNSI.com All-American
FWAA All-American
Big Ten Defensive Player of the Year
First-team All-Big Ten
Big Ten Defensive Player of the Week (September 21)
CNNSI.com mid-season first-team All-American
 Joe Iorio
First-team Verizon CoSIDA Academic All-American
First-team Verizon CoSIDA Academic All-District
 Bryant Johnson
First-team All-Big Ten (conference coaches selection)
 Larry Johnson
2002 Doak Walker Award winner
2002 Maxwell Award winner
AFCA All-American
First-team Associated Press All-American
Chevrolet Offensive Player of the Year
FWAA All-American
CNNSI.com All-American
Walter Camp Player of the Year
First-team Walter Camp All-American
First-team All-Big Ten
Big Ten Offensive Player of the Week (October 19)
Big Ten Offensive Player of the Week (November 2)
Big Ten Offensive Player of the Week (November 16)
ESPN.com Player of the Week (November 16)
Sporting News Player of the Week (November 16)
USA Today Player of the Week (November 16)
Big Ten Offensive Player of the Week (November 23)
Most Valuable Player, 2003 Senior Bowl
 Jimmy Kennedy
Third-team Associated Press All-American
First-team Walter Camp All-American
Big Ten Defensive Lineman of the Year
First-team All-Big Ten
Big Ten Defensive Player of the Week (October 5)
 Shawn Mayer
Second-team All-Big Ten
Big Ten Defensive Player of the Week (October 26)
 Zack Mills
Big Ten Offensive Player of the Week (September 28)
 Matt Schmitt
First-team Verizon CoSIDA Academic All-District

Post season
Penn State finished the season ranked #16 in the final AP college football poll and #15 in the final Coaches college football poll, earning Penn State its 25th Top 15 finish under Joe Paterno.

Tailback Larry Johnson would finish the season as the first Nittany Lion to lead the nation in rushing and all-purpose yardage. Johnson become the ninth player in Division I-A history to gain 2,000 yards rushing in the regular season, finishing third in Heisman Trophy balloting.

Penn State claimed second place in football attendance for the second consecutive season, averaging 107,239 through eight home games, ranking in the top four for the 12th consecutive year. The Nittany Lions also broke the NCAA record for total season attendance with 1,247,707 during the 13-game schedule, including a Beaver Stadium record of 110,753 for the Nebraska game.

NFL draft
A school record six seniors would be drafted in the first two rounds of the 2003 NFL Draft, including another school record four players in the first round.

All-star games

Instant replay
A few other conference coaches had lobbied for instant replay before, but they had fallen on deaf ears until Joe Paterno, who had been against instant replay citing the length of games as a factor, changed his opinion after a number of questionable officiating calls in the Iowa and Michigan games. Paterno and Penn State athletic director Tim Curley called for a comprehensive review of Big Ten officiating. At the news conference after the Michigan game, Paterno went further and said that the conference should change the way that officials are assigned, referring to the assignment of the officiating crew that worked the Michigan game, three of whom live in the state of Michigan.

After the Big Ten concluded its comprehensive review of its officiating, the conference implemented a pilot program during the 2003 season to evaluate the use of instant replay. The pilot was used to gather data and did not interfere with games or overturn any missed calls.

For the 2004 season, the Big Ten introduced college football's first instant replay system. A technical advisor in the press box with access to the television feeds will be able to stop a game for a replay review and potentially overturn a play, with no limit on the number of plays that can be reviewed.

Notes 

 Penn State set a new single season attendance record of 857,911 fans.

References

Penn State
Penn State Nittany Lions football seasons
Penn State Nittany Lions football